The Luning Formation is a geologic formation in Nevada. It preserves fossils dating back to the Triassic period.

Fossil content 
The Luning Formation contains significant fossils of invertebrate fauna such as ammonites, bivalves and brachiopods. The site is known for its ichthyosaur fossils.

Vertebrates 

 Shonisaurus popularis

Invertebrates 

 Balatonospira lipoldi
 Guembelites philostrati
 Plectoconcha aequiplicata 
 P. newbyi sp. nov.
 Rhaetina gregaria
 Sagenites minaensis
 Spiriferina gregaria
 S. peneckei
 Spondylospira lewesensis
 Terebratula debilis
 Terebratula suborbicularis
 Tibetothyris julica
 Zeilleria sp.
 Zugmayerella uncinata

See also

 List of fossiliferous stratigraphic units in Nevada
 Paleontology in Nevada

References

 

Triassic geology of Nevada